Interstate relations between the United States and Belarus began in 1991 upon the dissolution of the Soviet Union, of which Belarus had been a part.  However, the relations have turned sour due to accusations by the United States that Belarus has been violating human rights.  Belarus, in turn, has accused the United States of interfering in its internal affairs.

In 2008 Belarus recalled its ambassador from Washington and insisted that the Ambassador of the United States must leave Minsk.

According to the 2012 U.S. Global Leadership Report, only 20% of Belarusians approve of U.S. leadership, with 30% disapproving and 50% uncertain, the fourth-lowest rating for any surveyed country in Europe.

1991 through 2000 
On 25 December 1991, the United States recognized the independence of the Republic of Belarus, and on 28 December, Belarus and the United States established diplomatic relations. On 31 January 1992, the U.S. Embassy was officially opened in Minsk. In 1993, the embassy of Belarus was opened in Washington. Prime Minister of Belarus Vyacheslav Kebich received visiting U.S. Secretary of State Warren Christopher on 26 October 1993, promising new presidential elections. 

On 15 January 1994, U.S. President Bill Clinton visited Minsk on a 6-hour state visit, following a recent visit to Moscow and acting as a preceding a visit to Switzerland. It was considered to be a "thank you" visit after Belarus agreed to transfer their Soviet nuclear stockpile to Russia. He was received by Chairman Stanislav Shushkevich at Minsk National Airport, after which Clinton laid a wreath on Victory Square and met with youth in the Academy of Sciences, as well as visited Kurapaty (wooded area on the outskirts of Minsk where a vast number of people were executed during the Great Purge by the NKVD). Clinton, as well as First Lady Hillary Clinton and their daughter Chelsea, also met children suffering from illnesses during a visit to Pediatric Hospital No. 4.

The United States has encouraged Belarus to conclude and adhere to agreements with the International Monetary Fund (IMF) on the program of macroeconomic stabilization and related reform measures, as well as to undertake increased privatization and to create a favorable climate for business and investment. Although there has been some American direct private investment in Belarus, its development has been relatively slow given the uncertain pace of reform. 

An Overseas Private Investment Corporation agreement was signed in June 1992 but has been suspended since 1995 because Belarus did not fulfill its obligations under the agreement. Belarus is eligible for Export-Import Bank short-term financing insurance for U.S. investments, but because of the adverse business climate, no projects have been initiated.

2001 through 2004 

In early September 2001, the United States condemned Belarus for having irregularities in the recent election, causing Alexander Lukashenko to be re-elected. However, this criticism was short lived, as the United States came under the September 11, 2001 attacks two days later.

During Operation Iraqi Freedom, several American intelligence agencies accused Belarus of providing a safe haven for the deposed leader, Saddam Hussein, and his sons, Uday and Qusay. The only evidence that was presented was a cargo flight from the Iraqi capital of Baghdad to the Belarusian capital of Minsk, documentation of which was found after the capture of the Baghdad airport in April 2003. While some sources said that Lukashenko was close to Saddam and Saddam had thought about leaving Iraq to go to Belarus, Saddam was found in Iraq in December 2003 and his sons were killed in Iraq a few months earlier.

Belarus-U.S. relations were further strained after Congress unanimously passed the Belarus Democracy Act of 2004, which the Belarusian government believes interferes with Belarusian internal affairs.

2006 through 2019

Following the 2006 Belarusian presidential election, US introduced sanctions against Belarus individuals and companies for "the actions and policies...  to undermine Belarus' democratic processes or institutions, manifested most recently in the fundamentally undemocratic March 2006 elections, to commit human rights abuses related to political repression, including detentions and disappearances, and to engage in public corruption including by diverting or misusing Belarusian public assets or by misusing public authority." The assets of said persons and companies in the US are frozen and transactions with them are prohibited.

The sanctions list, as of January 2017, contains the following persons:
 President Alexander Lukashenko
 his son and national security assistant Viktor Lukashenko
 former Justice Minister Viktar Halavanau
 former deputy Justice Minister Oleg Slizhevsky
 former head of Belteleradio Aliaksandr Zimouski
 former director of the KGB Stepan Sukhorenko
 former Prosecutor General Petr Miklashevich,
 Dmitri Pavlichenko
 Viktor Sheiman
 Lidia Yermoshina
 Natalia Petkevich
 Uladzimir Navumau
 OMON commander Yury Podobed
 Alexander Radkov
 Vladimir Rusakevich
 Yury Sivakov

The list of the companies sanctioned includes Belshina, Belneftekhim, Polotsk-Steklovolokno, Grodno Azot, Naftan and others.

One of the few bilateral events during this period in relations was the visit to Minsk by the United States Air Forces in Europe Band in May 2015, where they performed at the Brest Fortress and the 2015 Minsk Victory Day Parade in honor of the 70th anniversary of the defeat of Nazism.

2019 to present

On August 29, 2019, National Security Adviser John Bolton met with Lukashenko in Minsk to discuss improving relations between the two countries. On 1 February 2020, U.S. Secretary of State Mike Pompeo visited Belarus for the first time in 26 years, to offer American aid after Russian decision to cut off energy supplies. In July 2020, Deputy Minister of Foreign Affairs Oleg Kravchenko was appointed Belarusian Ambassador to the United States.

In August 2020, Belarusian President Alexander Lukashenko said security forces had arrested "a number of" U.S. citizens, just days before the country went to the polls for a presidential election. In the speech, Lukashenko claimed Belarus was the victim of a "hybrid war", and that "we should expect dirty tricks from any side".

In the aftermath of the 2020 Presidential elections, Secretary Pompeo voiced his deep concerns about how the election was "Not free and fair". In addition, he urged the Belarusian security forces to respect their citizens right to peacefully assemble, refrain from using force, and release persons who were wrongfully detained.

In May 2021 the United States and other countries denounced Belarus' authorities forcing Ryanair Flight 4978 to land in Belarus' territory.

On 28 February 2022, the United States suspended its embassy in Belarus following intelligence from Ukraine that the country was preparing to join with its ally Russia in invading Ukraine.

Trade
Belarus — United States trade volume (million USD, according to Belstat):

Largest export positions of Belarus (2017, according to Belstat):
 Potash fertilizers (135 million USD)
 Seamless pipes, tubes and profiles (25.8 million USD)
 X-ray equipment (12.2 million USD)
 Furniture (6.9 million USD)

Largest export positions of USA (2017, according to Belstat):
 Medical equipment (30.1 million USD)
 Cars (27.3 million USD)
 Vaccines, serums (20.2 million USD)
 Combustion piston engines (17 million USD)
 Frozen fish (14.3 million USD)
 Car bodies (13.4 million USD)
 Electric engines and generators (10.6 million USD)

Diplomatic missions

The Embassy of Belarus in Washington, D.C. is located at 1619 New Hampshire Avenue, Northwest, Washington, D.C., in the Dupont Circle neighborhood. The embassy also operates a Consulate-General in New York City. The Chargé d'Affaires ad interim is Dmitry Basik.

See also
 Belarusian Americans
 Drazdy conflict
 List of people and organizations sanctioned in relation to human rights violations in Belarus

References

External links

History of Belarus - U.S. relations
Digital Video Conference with Deputy Assistant Secretary Steven Pifer and Belarusian and International Journalists (2003)

 
United States
Bilateral relations of the United States